The 2013–14 Hofstra Pride men's basketball team represented Hofstra University during the 2013–14 NCAA Division I men's basketball season. The Pride, led by first year head coach Joe Mihalich, played their home games at Mack Sports Complex and were members of the Colonial Athletic Association. They finished the season 10–23, 5–11 in CAA play to finish in eighth place. They advanced to the quarterfinals of the CAA tournament where they lost to Delaware.

Roster

Schedule

|-
!colspan=9 style="background:#16007C; color:#FFAD00;"| Regular season

|-
!colspan=9 style="background:#16007C; color:#FFAD00;"| 2014 CAA tournament

References

Hofstra Pride men's basketball seasons
Hofstra